The Dubai Tennis Championships or Dubai Open (also known as the Dubai Duty Free Tennis Championships for sponsorship reasons) (formerly known for sponsorship reasons as the Barclays Dubai Tennis Championships and the Dubai Duty Free Men's and Women's Championships) is a professional tennis tournament owned and organized by Dubai Duty Free and held annually in Dubai, United Arab Emirates on outdoor hardcourts.

The tournament takes place at the end of February and organizes a men's and women's event.  The tournament takes place under the patronage of Sheikh Mohammed bin Rashid Al Maktoum, Vice President and Prime Minister of the UAE and Ruler of Dubai. In 2001 the ATP upgraded the tournament from an ATP 250 level to a more prestigious ATP 500 level tournament. On the WTA Tour, it alternates yearly between a WTA 1000 level tournament and a WTA 500 level tournament. Prior to the 1990s there was an annual Dubai Tennis Championship played at the British Embassy.

The Dubai Tennis Championships was the third tournament in pro tennis history to award equal prize money for both men and women, until 2021.

The courts usually have a medium-fast speed considered to be similar in speed to the Shanghai and Swiss Indoor (Basel) courts.

History

The Dubai Tennis Championships debuted at the Aviation Club in 1993 as an ATP 250 tournament. At the time there was no formal stadium and the tournament was hosted on hardcourts surrounded by temporary scaffold seating to host a total of 3000 viewers across all courts.

In 1996, the Dubai Tennis Championships took place at the newly erected Dubai Tennis Stadium at the Aviation Club. The construction of the Dubai Tennis Stadium also led to the development of various food & beverage entertainment locations in and around the stadium base, like the Irish and Century Villages. In 2012, a 293-bedroom hotel was constructed on-site that hosts many of the players and officials during the 2 week event.

The inaugural ATP men's tournament was won by Karel Nováček in 1993 who was ranked world number 23 at the time. The inaugural WTA women's tournament debuted in 2001 as a Premier tournament and was won by Martina Hingis.

For five years, Swiss Roger Federer, on the men's side, and Belgian Justine Henin, on the women's side, dominated the singles' tournaments. Between 2003 and 2007, Federer and Henin each won the singles title four times. However, in 2008, neither player managed to reach the finals; Andy Roddick and Elena Dementieva became the new champions. Currently, the reigning champions are Aslan Karatsev and Garbiñe Muguruza.

In 2005, the Dubai Tennis Championships implemented equal prize money policy becoming the third professional tennis event to do so after the US Open and Australian Open.

2009 Shahar Pe'er visa controversy
In February 2009, Israeli player Shahar Pe'er was denied an entry visa by the United Arab Emirates, a country that did not have diplomatic relations with Israel at the time. Tournament director Salah Tahlak said that Pe'er was refused on the grounds that her appearance could incite anger in the Arab country, after she had already faced protests earlier at the ASB Classic over the 2008–2009 Israel–Gaza conflict. A number of top-seeded players, among them Venus Williams, condemned the action not to grant Pe'er a visa.

In response, the Dubai Tennis Championship was fined a record US$300,000. The fine was appealed by DTC, but the WTA Tour Board rejected the appeal. Pe'er was awarded a guarantee to enter the next (2010) edition of the event, plus US$44,250, an amount equal to the average prize money she earned per tournament in 2008. A number of highly ranked tennis players, including 2008 winner Andy Roddick, pulled out of the men's event (ATP 500 Dubai) which was scheduled to take place the week after the women's event. As a result, the UAE issued Israeli Andy Ram a visa for the men's tournament.

Past finals

In the men's singles, Roger Federer (winner in 2003–05, 2007, 2012, 2014–15, 2019, runner-up in 2006, 2011) holds the records for most titles (eight), most finals (ten), and most consecutive titles (three), sharing the last record with Novak Djokovic (winner in 2009–11, 2013, 2020, runner-up in 2015). In the women's singles, Justine Henin (2003–04, 2006–07) holds the record for most titles (four) and shares with Venus Williams (2009–10, 2014) and Elina Svitolina (2017–18) the record for most consecutive titles (two). In men's doubles, Mahesh Bhupathi (1998, 2004, 2008, 2012–13) has won the most overall titles (five), and co-holds with Grant Connell (1995–96) the record for most consecutive titles (two). In women's doubles, Liezel Huber (2007–09, 2011–12) took the most titles (five) and, alongside partner Cara Black (2007–09), the most back-to-back titles (three).

Men's singles

Women's singles

Men's doubles

Women's doubles

Notes

References

External links

ATP tournament profile
Official website
Dubai Duty Free Tennis Championships – Dubai Events Official Listings

 
Tennis tournaments in the United Arab Emirates
Sports competitions in Dubai
Hard court tennis tournaments
ATP Tour 500
WTA Tour
Recurring sporting events established in 1993